Acer duplicatoserratum is a species of maple, native to southern and eastern mainland China (Anhui, Fujian, Guizhou, Henan, Hubei, Hunan, Jiangsu, Jiangxi, Shandong, Zhejiang) and  Taiwan.

Acer duplicatoserratum is a small tree, in the same group of maples as Acer palmatum.

There are two varieties:
Acer duplicatoserratum var. duplicatoserratum. Taiwan, endemic; listed as Vulnerable. It occurs in submontane broadleaved forest scattered in central to northern parts of the island. Leaf petioles always pubescent.
Acer duplicatoserratum var. chinense C.S.Chang. Mainland China, in deciduous forests at elevations of  asl. Leaf petioles pubescent only when young, becoming hairless as they grow.

References

duplicatoserratum
Plants described in 1911
Taxa named by Bunzō Hayata
Taxonomy articles created by Polbot
Trees of China
Trees of Taiwan